Raúl Méndez Martínez (born April 11, 1975 in Laguna, Torreón, Mexico) is a Mexican actor of film, theater and television.

Biography 
He studied acting at the Center for Arts Education Monterrey and La Casa del Teatro with Luis de Tavira between 1994 and 1999. He has worked in numerous theatrical productions. He is one of the most chameleonic actors of Mexico. In 2005, he was nominated for his work on Ariel Matando Cabos. Personifies from a murderer in The Legend of Zorro, as an executive assistant in a wonderful world. KM participated in the tape 31 has been of the highest grossing Mexico, nominated for three Ariels. He also participated in Showtime chain FIDEL off Gael García and Víctor Huggo Martin. He portrayed Colombian former president Cesar Gaviria in Narcos.

Filmography

Film roles

Television roles

Awards and nominations

References

External links 

1975 births
Living people
Male actors from Coahuila
Mexican male film actors
Mexican male stage actors
Mexican male telenovela actors
Mexican male television actors
People from Torreón
20th-century Mexican male actors
21st-century Mexican male actors